The Basisbibliotheek (Basic Libray of Dutch Literature) comprises a list of 1000 works of Dutch Literature culturally important to the cultural heritage of the Low Countries, and is published on the DBNL. Several of these works are lists themselves; such as early dictionaries, lists of songs, recipes, biographies or encyclopedic compilations of information such as mathematical, scientific, medical or plant reference books. Other items include early translations of literature from other countries, history books, and first-hand diaries and published correspondence. Notable original works can be found by author name.

What follows is the list of the first 500 works, leading up to the early 20th century.

Middle Ages

Dutch Golden Age

18th century

19th century

20th century (up to 1930s)

For the rest of the 20th century and works from the 21st century, see the second half of the list.

See also
 Dutch Literature
 Canon of the Netherlands
 Books in the Netherlands

References

Dutch literature
Netherlandic studies